Moabite Notebook is a 1968 Soviet drama film directed by Leonid Kvinikhidze.

Plot 
The film tells about the famous Tatar poet Musa Jalil, who ended up in the fascist prison of Moabit, where he wrote over 100 verses.

Cast 
 Rafkat Bikchentayev as Shafi
 Aivars Bogdanovics as Timmermans (as Ayvars Bogdanovich)
 Pyotr Chernov as Musa Jalil
 Ildar Khairulin as Zayni
 Khavza Mingashudinova as Idrisi
 Laimonas Noreika as Rosenberg
 Azgar Shakirov as Abdulla

References

External links 
 

1968 films
1960s Russian-language films
Soviet drama films
1968 drama films